Flindersia pimenteliana, commonly known as maple silkwood, red beech or rose silkwood, is a species of tree in the family Rutaceae and is native to New Guinea and Queensland. It has pinnate leaves with three to seven egg-shaped to elliptic leaflets, panicles of red or reddish flowers and fruit studded with rough points.

Description

Taxonomy
Flindersia pimenteliana was first formally described in 1875 by Ferdinand von Mueller in Fragmenta phytographiae Australiae from specimens collected near Rockingham Bay by John Dallachy.

Distribution and habitat
Maple silkwood grows in rainforest in Australia and New Guinea.

Uses
Good quality, decorative cabinet timber has been produced by this tree but because it is mostly only found in reserves, the timber is in very short supply. Attempts to grow this species in plantations have failed.

Chemical constituents
F. pimenteliana contains tryptamine alkaloids known as pimentelamines. They are adducts of ascorbic acid. The plant also contains 2-isoprenyl-N,N-dimethyltryptamine, another tryptamine alkaloid, as well as 4-methylborreverine, borreverine, dimethylisoborreverine, quercitrin, and carpachromene.

References

pimenteliana
Sapindales of Australia
Flora of Papua New Guinea
Flora of Western New Guinea
Flora of Queensland
Plants described in 1875
Taxa named by Ferdinand von Mueller